Music From The Motion Picture Woo is the soundtrack to Daisy von Scherler Mayer's 1998 comedy film Woo. It was released on May 5, 1998 through Epic Records and consisted of hip hop and R&B music. The soundtrack was a moderate success, peaking at 52 on the Billboard 200 and 8 on the Top R&B/Hip-Hop Albums and featured three charting singles Charli Baltimore's "Money", which went to #50 on the Hot Rap Singles, Nate Dogg and Warren G's "Nobody Does It Better" and Cam'ron's "357".

Track listing

References

External links

Hip hop soundtracks
1998 soundtrack albums
Comedy film soundtracks
Epic Records soundtracks
Romance film soundtracks
Albums produced by Warren G
Albums produced by Ant Banks
Rhythm and blues soundtracks
Albums produced by Cory Rooney
Albums produced by Dame Grease
Albums produced by Trackmasters
Albums produced by Clark Kent (producer)